The Portuguese people are a Romance nation and ethnic group indigenous to Portugal who share a common culture, ancestry and language. The Portuguese people's heritage largely derives from the Indo-Europeans (Lusitanians, Conii)<ref>"the Indo-European but clearly non-Celtic language that we today call Lusitanian.(...)": Book Reviews: Alejandro G. Sinner, Javier Velaza (eds.). Palaeohispanic Languages and Epigraphies, Oxford University Press, 2019, Juan Luis García Alonso, University of Salamanca, Spain, Journal of Language Relationship, № 19/3-4, 2021</ref> and Celts (Gallaecians, Turduli and Celtici), who were Romanized after the conquest of the region by the ancient Romans. A small number of male lineages descend from Germanic tribes who arrived after the Roman period as ruling elites, including the Suebi, Buri, Hasdingi Vandals and Visigoths.https://alpha.sib.uc.pt/?q=content/o-património-visigodo-da-l%C3%ADngua-portuguesa  The pastoral Caucasus' Alans left small traces in a few central-southern areas.Ivo Xavier Fernándes. Topónimos e gentílicos, Volume 1, 1941, p. 144. The Umayyad conquest of Iberia also left Moorish, Jewish and Saqaliba genetic contributions in the country.

The Roman Republic conquered the Iberian Peninsula during the 2nd and 1st centuries B.C. from the extensive maritime empire of Carthage during the series of Punic Wars. As a result of Roman colonization, the Portuguese language stems primarily from Vulgar Latin. Due to the large historical extent from the 16th century of the Portuguese Empire and the subsequent colonization of territories in Asia, Africa and the Americas, as well as historical and recent emigration, Portuguese communities can be found in many diverse regions around the globe, and a significant Portuguese diaspora exists.

Portuguese people began an Age of Exploration which started in 1415 with the conquest of Ceuta and culminated in an empire with territories that are now part of over 50 countries. The Portuguese Empire lasted nearly 600 years, seeing its end when Macau was returned to China in 1999. The discovery of several lands unknown to Europeans in the Americas, Africa, Asia and Oceania (southwest Pacific Ocean), forged the Portuguese Empire described as the first global maritime and commercial empire, becoming one of the world's major economic, political and military powers in the 15th and 16th centuries. Portugal paved the way to the subsequent domination of Western civilization by other neighbouring European nations.

Ancestry

Historical origins and genetics
 

The Portuguese are a Southwestern European population, with origins predominantly from Southern and Western Europe. The earliest modern humans inhabiting Portugal are believed to have been Paleolithic peoples that may have arrived in the Iberian Peninsula as early as 35,000 to 40,000 years ago. Current interpretation of Y-chromosome and mtDNA data suggests that modern-day Portuguese trace a proportion of these lineages to the paleolithic peoples who began settling the European continent between the end of the last glaciation around 45,000 years ago.

Northern Iberia is believed to have been a major Ice Age refuge from which Paleolithic humans later colonized Europe. Migrations from what is now northern Iberia during the Paleolithic and Mesolithic link modern Iberians to the populations of much of Western Europe, and particularly the British Isles and Atlantic Europe.

Y-chromosome haplogroup R1b is the most common haplogroup in practically all of the Iberian peninsula and western Europe. Within the R1b haplogroup there are modal haplotypes. One of the best-characterized of these haplotypes is the Atlantic Modal Haplotype (AMH). This haplotype reaches the highest frequencies in the Iberian Peninsula and in the British Isles. In Portugal it reckons generally 65% in the South summing 87% northwards, and in some regions 96%. The Neolithic colonization of Europe from Western Asia and the Middle East, beginning around 10,000 years ago, reached Iberia and most of the rest of the continent, although according to the demic diffusion model its impact was greatest in the southern and eastern regions of the European continent.

Starting in the 3rd millennium BC, during the Bronze Age, the first wave of migrations into Iberia by speakers of Indo-European languages occurred. These were later (7th and 5th centuries BC) followed by waves of Celts. Major genetic studies since 2015 have now shown that haplogroup R1b in western Europe, most common in many areas of Atlantic Europe, largely expanded in massive migrations from the Pontic–Caspian steppe of eastern Europe during the Bronze Age, along with carriers of Indo-European languages like proto-Celtic and proto-Italic. Unlike older studies on uniparental markers, large amounts of autosomal DNA were analyzed in addition to paternal Y-DNA. An autosomal component was detected in modern Europeans which was not present in the Neolithic or Mesolithic, and which entered into Europe with paternal lineages R1b and R1a, as well as the Indo-European languages.

These two processes defined Iberia's, and Portugal's, cultural landscape—Continental in the northwest and Mediterranean towards the southeast, as historian José Mattoso describes it.
The northwest–southeast cultural shift also shows in genetic differences: based on Salas et al. findings, haplogroup H, a cluster that is nested within the haplogroup R category, is more prevalent along the Atlantic façade, including the Cantabrian coast and Portugal. It displays the highest frequency in Galicia (northwestern corner of Iberia). The frequency of haplogroup H shows a decreasing trend from the Atlantic façade toward the Mediterranean regions.

This finding adds strong evidence where Galicia and Northern Portugal was found to be a cul-de-sac population, a kind of European edge for a major ancient central European migration. Therefore, there is an interesting pattern of genetic continuity existing along the Cantabria coast and Portugal, a pattern that has been observed previously when minor sub-clades of the mtDNA phylogeny were examined.

Given the origins from Paleolithic and Neolithic settlers, as well as Bronze Age and Iron Age Indo-European migrations, one can say that the Portuguese ethnic origin is mainly a mixture of pre-Celts or para-Celts, such as the Lusitanians of Lusitania, and Celtic peoples such as Gallaeci of Gallaecia, the Celtici and the Cynetes of Alentejo and the Algarve. The Romans also left a major impact on the population, both genetically and in Portuguese culture; the Portuguese language derives mostly from Latin.

After the Romans, Germanic peoples, namely the Suebi and the Visigoths, ruled the peninsula as elites for several centuries and assimilated into the local populations. Some of the Vandals (Silingi and Hasdingi) and Alans also remained. The Suebians of northern and central Portugal and of Galicia were the most numerous of the Germanic tribes. Portugal and Galicia, (along with Catalonia which was part of the Frankish Kingdom), are the regions with the highest ratios today of Germanic Y-DNA in the Iberian peninsula.

The Moors occupied what is now Portugal from the 8th century until the Reconquista movement expelled them from the Algarve in 1249. Some of their population, mainly Berbers and Jews converted to Christianity and became New Christians (Cristãos novos), still identifiable by their new surnames. Several genetic studies, including the most comprehensive genome-wide studies published on historical and modern populations of the Iberian Peninsula conclude that the Moorish occupation left a minor Jewish, Arab and Berber genetic influence throughout most of Iberia, with higher incidence in the south and west, and lower incidence in the northeast; almost nonexistent in the Basque Country. Religious and ethnic minorities such as the "new Christians" or "Ciganos" (Roma gypsies) would later suffer persecution from the state and the Holy Inquisition and many were expelled and condemned under the Auto-da-fé sentencing or fled the country, creating a Jewish diaspora in the Netherlands, England, America, Brazil, The Balkans and other parts of the world.

Other minor influences include small Viking settlements between the 9th and 11th centuries, made by Norsemen who raided coastal areas mainly in the northern regions of Douro and Minho.

The Portuguese share a degree of ethnic characteristics with the Basques, since ancient times. The results of the present HLA study in Portuguese populations show that they have features in common with Basques and some Spaniards from Madrid: a high frequency of the HLA-haplotypes A29-B44-DR7 (ancient western Europeans) and A1-B8-DR3 are found as common characteristics. Many Portuguese and Basques do not show the Mediterranean A33-B14-DR1 haplotype, confirming a lower admixture with Mediterraneans.

The Portuguese have a characteristic unique among world populations: a high frequency of HLA-A25-B18-DR15 and A26-B38-DR13, which may reflect a still detectable founder effect coming from ancient Portuguese, i.e., Oestriminis and Cynetes. According to an early genetic study, the Portuguese are a relatively distinct population according to HLA data, as they have a high frequency of the HLA-A25-B18-DR15 and A26-B38-DR13 genes, the latter is a unique Portuguese marker. In Europe, the A25-B18-DR15 gene is only found in Portugal, and it is also observed in white North Americans and in Brazilians (very likely of Portuguese ancestry).

The pan-European (most probably Celtic) haplotype A1-B8-DR3 and the western-European haplotype A29-B44-DR7 are shared by Portuguese, Basques and Spaniards. The latter is also common in Irish, southern English, and western French populations.

Lusitanians

The Lusitanians (or Lusitānus/Lusitani in Latin) were an Indo-European speaking people living in the Western Iberian Peninsula long before it became the Roman province of Lusitania (modern Portugal, Extremadura and a small part of Salamanca). They spoke the Lusitanian language, of which only a few short written fragments survive. Most Portuguese consider the Lusitanians as their ancestors, although the northern regions (Minho, Douro, Trás-os-Montes) identify more with the Gallaecians. Prominent modern linguists such as Ellis Evans believe that Gallaecian-Lusitanian was one language (not separate languages) of the "p" Celtic variant.

It has been hypothesized that the Lusitanians may have originated in the Alps and settled in the region in the 6th century BC. Some modern scholars like Daithi O Hogain consider them to be indigenous and initially dominated by the Celts, before gaining full independence from them. The archaeologist Scarlat Lambrino proposed that they were originally a tribal Celtic group, related to the Lusones.

The first area settled by the Lusitanians was probably the Douro valley and the region of Beira Alta; then they moved south, and expanded on both sides of the Tagus river, before being conquered by the Romans.
The original Roman province of Lusitania was extended north of the areas occupied by the Lusitanians to include the territories of Asturias and Gallaecia but these were soon ceded to the jurisdiction of the Provincia Tarraconensis in the north, while the south remained the Provincia Lusitania et Vettones. After this, Lusitania's northern border was along the Douro river, while its eastern border passed through Salmantica and Caesarobriga to the Anas (Guadiana) river.

The Lusitanian ethnicity and particularly, their language is not totally certain. They originated from either Proto-Celtic or Proto-Italic populations who spread from Central Europe into western Europe after new Yamnaya migrations into the Danube Valley, while Proto-Germanic and Proto-Balto-Slavic may have developed east of the Carpathian mountains, in present-day Ukraine, moving north and spreading with the Corded Ware culture in Middle Europe (third millennium BCE). Alternatively, a European branch of Indo-European dialects, termed "North-west Indo-European" and associated with the Bell Beaker culture, may have been ancestral to not only Celtic and Italic, but also to Germanic and Balto-Slavic.

Pre-Roman groups

The Lusitanians were a large tribe that lived between the rivers Douro and Tagus. As the Lusitanians fought fiercely against the Romans for independence, the name Lusitania was adopted by the Gallaeci, tribes living north of the Douro, and other closely surrounding tribes, eventually spreading as a label to all the nearby peoples fighting Roman rule in the west of Iberia. It was for this reason that the Romans came to name their original province in the area, that initially covered the entire western side of the Iberian peninsula, Lusitania.

Tribes, often known by their Latin names, living in the area of modern Portugal, prior to Roman rule:
 Bardili (Turduli) – living in the Setúbal peninsula; Bracari – living between the rivers Tâmega and Cávado, in the area of the modern city of Braga; Callaici – living along and north of the Douro; Celtici – Celts living in Alentejo; Coelerni – living in the mountains between the rivers Tua and Sabor; Cynetes or Conii – living in the Algarve and the south of Alentejo; Equaesi – living in the most mountainous region of modern Portugal; Grovii – a mysterious tribe living in the Minho valley; Interamici – living in Trás-os-Montes and in the border areas with Galicia and León (in modern Spain); Leuni – living between the rivers Lima and Minho; Luanqui – living between the rivers Tâmega and Tua; Lusitani – being the most numerous and dominant of the whole region comprising most of Portugal; Limici – living in the swamps of the river Lima, on the border between Portugal and Galicia); Narbasi – living in the north of modern Portugal (interior) and nearby area of southern Galicia; Nemetati – living north of the Douro Valley in the area of Mondim; Oestriminis also referred to as Sefes and supposedly linked to the Cempsii – there isn’t a consensus regarding their exact origins and location. They are believed to have been the first known humans to inhabit the whole Atlantic margin covering Portugal and Galicia, the people from ‘Finis terrae’ at the end of the Western world. Paesuri – a dependent tribe of the Lusitanians, living between the rivers Douro and Vouga; Quaquerni – living in the mountains at the mouths of rivers Cávado and Tâmega; Seurbi – living between the rivers Cávado and Lima (or even reaching the river Minho); Tamagani – from the area of Chaves, near the river Tâmega; Tapoli – another dependent tribe of the Lusitanians, living north of the river Tagus, on the border between modern Portugal and Spain; Turduli – in the east of Alentejo (Guadiana Valley); Turduli Veteres – the "ancient Turduli" living south of the estuary of the river Douro; Turdulorum Oppida – Turduli living in the Portuguese region of Estremadura and Beira Litoral; Turodi – living in Trás-os-Montes and bordering areas of Galicia; Vettones – living in the eastern border areas of Portugal, and in Spanish provinces of Ávila and Salamanca, as well as parts of Zamora, Toledo and Cáceres; Zoelae – living in the mountains of Serra da Nogueira, Sanabria and Culebra, up to the mountains of Mogadouro in northern Portugal and adjacent areas of Galicia.Romanization

Since 193 B.C., the Lusitanians had been fighting Rome and its expansion into the peninsula following the defeat and occupation of Carthage in North Africa. They defended themselves bravely for years, causing the Roman invaders serious defeats. In 150 B.C., they were defeated by Praetor Servius Galba: springing a clever trap, he killed 9,000 Lusitanians and later sold 20,000 more as slaves further northeast in the newly conquered Roman provinces in Gaul (modern France) by Julius Caesar. Three years later (147 B.C.), Viriathus became the leader of the Lusitanians and severely damaged the Roman rule in Lusitania and beyond. He commanded a confederation of Celtic tribes and prevented the Roman expansion through guerrilla warfare. In 139 B.C. Viriathus was betrayed and killed in his sleep by his companions (who had been sent as emissaries to the Romans), Audax, Ditalcus and Minurus, bribed by Marcus Popillius Laenas. However, when Audax, Ditalcus and Minurus returned to receive their reward by the Romans, the Consul Quintus Servilius Caepio ordered their execution, declaring, "Rome does not pay traitors".

Viriathus is the first ‘national hero’ for the Portuguese as Vercingetorix is for the French or Boudicca for the English. After Viriathus' rule, the celticized Lusitanians became largely romanized, adopting Roman culture and the language of Latin. The Lusitanian cities, in a manner similar to those of the rest of the Roman-Iberian peninsula, eventually gained the status of "Citizens of Rome". The Portuguese language itself is mostly a local later evolution of the Roman language, Latin after the fall of the Western Roman Empire in the 5th and 6th centuries.

Demography

Demographics of Portugal

There are around 9.1 million Portuguese-born people in Portugal, out of a total population of 10.34 million. Dealing with citizenship, approximately 9.6 million peopleliving in Portugal hold Portuguese citizenship.

Native minority languages in Portugal
A small minority of about 10,000 speak the Mirandese language, (part of the Asturian-Leonese linguistic group which includes the Asturian and Leonese minority languages of Northwestern Spain) in the municipalities of Miranda do Douro, Vimioso and Mogadouro. All of the speakers are bilingual with Portuguese.

An even smaller minority of no more than 3,000 people speak Barranquenho, a dialect of Portuguese heavily influenced by southern Spanish, spoken in the Portuguese town of Barrancos (in the border between Extremadura and Andalusia, in Spain, and Portugal).

Ethnic minorities in Portugal
People from the former colonies, particularly Brazil, Portuguese Africa, Macau, Portuguese India and East Timor, have been migrating to Portugal since the 1900s. A great number of Slavs, especially Ukrainians (now the third biggest ethnic minority) and Russians, as well as Moldovans and Romanians, keep migrating to Portugal. There is a Chinese minority of Macau Cantonese origin and mainland Chinese. Indians, Nepalese, Bangladeshis and Pakistanis are also relevant in numbers.

In addition, there is a small minority of Romani about 52,000 in number, Muslims about 100,000 in number and an even smaller minority of Jews of about 5,000 people (the majority are Sephardi such as the Belmonte Jews, while some are Ashkenazi).

Portugal is also home to other EU and EEA/EFTA nationals (French, German, Dutch, Swedish, Spanish). The UK and France represented the largest senior residents communities in the country as of 2019.
Official migrants accounted to 6.4% of the population in 2020, with the tendency to increase further.

Portuguese diaspora
Overview
In the whole world, there are easily more than one hundred million people with recognizable Portuguese ancestors. This is due to the colonial expansion and worldwide immigration of Portuguese from the 16th century onwards to India (see Luso Indian), the Americas, Macau (see Macanese people), East-Timor, Malaysia, (see Kristang people), Indonesia, Burma (see Bayingyi people) and Africa (see Luso-Africans). Between 1886 and 1966 Portugal, after Ireland, was the second Western European country to lose more people to emigration. From the middle of the 19th century to the late 1950s, nearly two million Portuguese left Europe to live mainly in Brazil and with significant numbers to the United States. About 1.2 million Brazilian citizens are native Portuguese. Significant verified Portuguese minorities exist in several countries (see table). In 1989 some 4,000,000 Portuguese were living abroad, mainly in France, Germany, Brazil, South Africa, Canada, Venezuela, and the United States. Within Europe, substantial concentrations of Portuguese may be found in Francophone countries like France, Luxembourg and Switzerland, spurred in part by their linguistic proximity with the French language.

Portuguese Sephardi Jews
Descendants of Portuguese Sephardi Jews are found in Israel, the Netherlands, the United States, France, Venezuela, Brazil and Turkey. In Brazil many of the colonists were also originally Sephardi Jews, who, converted, were known as New Christians.

The Americas outside of Brazil and the Pacific

In the United States, there are Portuguese communities in New Jersey, the New England states, and California. Springfield, Illinois once possessed the largest Portuguese community in the Midwest. In the Pacific, Hawaii has a sizable Portuguese element that goes back 150 years (see Portuguese Americans), Australia and New Zealand also have Portuguese communities (see Portuguese Australians, Portuguese New Zealanders). Canada, particularly Ontario, Quebec and British Columbia, has developed a significant Portuguese community since 1940 (see Portuguese Canadians). Argentina (See Portuguese Argentine and Cape Verdean Argentine) and Uruguay (see Portuguese Uruguayan) had Portuguese immigration in the early 20th century. Venezuela who has the biggest number of Portuguese people in Latin America after Brazil, Portuguese arrived to Venezuela in the early and middle 20th century, as immigrants specially from Madeira.

Mexico has had flows of Portuguese immigration since the colonial period until the early 20th century, the most important settlements are in north eastern cities, such as Saltillo, Monterrey, Durango and Torreon. Portuguese fishermen, farmers and laborers dispersed across the Caribbean, especially Guyana (4.3% of the population in 1891), Trinidad, St. Vincent and the Grenadines, and the island of Barbados where there is high influence from the Portuguese community. The North Atlantic archipelago of Bermuda (3.75% to 10% of the population) has had sustained immigration from the Azores especially, as well as from Madeira and the Cape Verde Islands since the 1840s.

Africa

In the early twentieth century the Portuguese government encouraged white emigration to Angola and Mozambique, and by the 1970s, there were up to 1 million Portuguese settlers living in their overseas African provinces. An estimated 800,000 Portuguese returned to Portugal as the country's African possessions gained independence in 1975, after the Carnation Revolution, while others moved to South Africa, Botswana and Algeria.

In Europe outside of Portugal
Portuguese constitute 23.12% of the population of Luxembourg. 

In the United Kingdom, people of Portuguese origin were estimated at 400,000 in 2021 (see Portuguese in the United Kingdom). This is considerably higher than the estimated 170,000 Portuguese-born people residing in the country in 2021 (this figure does not include British-born people of Portuguese descent). In areas such as Thetford and the crown dependencies of Jersey and Guernsey, the Portuguese form the largest ethnic minority groups at 30% of the population, 9% and 3% respectively. The British capital London is home to the largest number of Portuguese people in the UK, with the majority being found in the boroughs of Kensington and Chelsea, Lambeth and Westminster.

Portuguese Diaspora in the rest of the world
There are Portuguese influenced people with their own culture and Portuguese based dialects in parts of the world other than former Portuguese colonies, notably in Barbados, Jamaica, Aruba, Curaçao, St. Vincent and the Grenadines, Trinidad and Tobago, Guyana (see Portuguese immigrants in Guyana), Equatorial Guinea and throughout Asia (Main Article Luso-Asians).

Luso-Asian communities exist in Malaysia, Singapore (see Kristang people), Indonesia, Sri Lanka (see Burgher people and Portuguese Burghers), Myanmar (see Bayingyi people) Thailand, India (see Luso-Indian) and Japan.

List of countries by population of Portuguese heritage

Portuguese ancestry in the Brazilian population

In colonial times, over 700,000 Portuguese settled in Brazil, and most of them went there during the gold rush of the 18th century.
Brazil received more European settlers during its colonial era than any other country in the Americas. Between 1500 and 1760, about 700,000 Europeans immigrated to Brazil, compared to 530,000 European immigrants in the United States.History of Immigration to the United States#Population in 1790 They managed to be the only significant European population to populate the country during colonization, even though there were French and Dutch invasions. The Portuguese migration was strongly marked by the predominance of men (colonial reports from the 16th and 17th centuries almost always report the absence or rarity of Portuguese women). This lack of women worried the Jesuits, who asked the Portuguese King to send any kind of Portuguese women to Brazil, even the socially undesirable (e.g. prostitutes or women with mental maladies such as Down Syndrome) if necessary. The Crown responded by sending groups of Iberian orphan maidens to marry both cohorts of marriageable men, the nobles and the peasants. Some of which were even primarily studying to be nuns.

The Crown also shipped over many Órfãs do Rei of what was considered "good birth" to colonial Brazil to marry Portuguese settlers of high rank. Órfãs do Rei'' literally translates to "Orphans of the King", and they were Portuguese female orphans in nubile age. There were noble and non-noble maidens and they were daughters of military compatriots who died in battle for the king or noblemen who died overseas and whose upbringing was paid by the Crown. Bahia's port in the East received one of the first groups of orphans in 1551. The multiplication of descendants of Portuguese settlers also happened to a large degree through miscegenation with black and amerindian women. In fact, in colonial Brazil the Portuguese men competed for the women, because among the African slaves the female component was also a small minority. This explains why the Portuguese men left more descendants in Brazil than the Amerindian or African men did. The Indian and African women were "dominated" by the Portuguese men, preventing men of color to find partners with whom they could have children. Added to this, White people had a much better quality of life and therefore a lower mortality rate than the black and indigenous population. Then, even though the Portuguese migration during colonial Brazil was smaller (3.2 million Indians estimated at the beginning of colonization and 3.6 million Africans brought since then, compared to the descendants of the over 700,000 Portuguese immigrants) the "white" population (whose ancestry was predominantly Portuguese) was as large as the "non-white" population in the early 19th century, just before independence from Portugal. After independence from Portugal in 1822, around 1.7 million Portuguese immigrants settled in Brazil.

Portuguese immigration into Brazil in the 19th and 20th centuries was marked by its concentration in the states of São Paulo and Rio de Janeiro. The immigrants opted mostly for urban centers. Portuguese women appeared with some regularity among immigrants, with percentage variation in different decades and regions of the country. However, even among the more recent influx of Portuguese immigrants at the turn of the 20th century, there were 319 men to each 100 women among them. The Portuguese were different from other immigrants in Brazil, like the Germans, or Italians who brought many women along with them (even though the proportion of men was higher in any immigrant community). Despite the small female proportion, Portuguese men married mainly Portuguese women. Female immigrants rarely married Brazilian men. In this context, the Portuguese had a rate of endogamy which was higher than any other European immigrant community, and behind only the Japanese among all immigrants.

Even with Portuguese heritage, many Portuguese-Brazilians identify themselves as being simply Brazilians, since Portuguese culture was a dominant cultural influence in the formation of Brazil (like many British Americans in the United States, who will never describe themselves as of British extraction, but only as "Americans", since British culture was a dominant cultural influence in the formation of The United States).

In 1872, there were 3.7 million Whites in Brazil (the vast majority of them of Portuguese ancestry), 4.1 million mixed-race people (mostly of Portuguese-African-Amerindian ancestry) and 1.9 million Blacks. These numbers give the percentage of 80% of people with total or partial Portuguese ancestry in Brazil in the 1870s.

In the late 19th and early 20th centuries, a new large wave of immigrants from Portugal arrived. From 1881 to 1991, over 1.5 million Portuguese immigrated to Brazil. In 1906, for example, there were 133,393 Portuguese-born people living in Rio de Janeiro, comprising 16% of the city's population. Rio is, still today, considered the largest "Portuguese city" outside of Portugal itself, with 1% Portuguese-born people.

Genetic studies also confirm the strong Portuguese genetic influence in Brazilians. According to a study, at least half of the Brazilian population's Y Chromosome (male inheritance) comes from Portugal. Black Brazilians have an average of 48% non-African genes, most of them may come from Portuguese ancestors. On the other hand, 33% Amerindian and 28% African contribution to the total mtDNA (female inheritance) of white Brazilians was found

An autosomal study from 2013, with nearly 1300 samples from all of the Brazilian regions, found a predominant degree of European ancestry (mostly Portuguese, due to the dominant Portuguese influx among European colonization and immigration to Brazil) combined with African and Native American contributions, in varying degrees. 'Following an increasing North to South gradient, European ancestry was the most prevalent in all urban populations (with values from 51% to 74%). The populations in the North consisted of a significant proportion of Native American ancestry that was about two times higher than the African contribution. Conversely, in the Northeast, Center-West and Southeast, African ancestry was the second most prevalent. At an intrapopulation level, all urban populations were highly admixed, and most of the variation in ancestry proportions was observed between individuals within each population rather than among population'.

A large community-based multicenter autosomal study from 2015, considering representative samples from three different urban communities located in the Northeast (Salvador, capital of Bahia), Southeast (Bambuí, interior of Minas Gerais) and South Brazilian (Pelotas, interior of Rio Grande do Sul) regions, estimated European ancestry to be 42.4%, 83.8% and 85.3%, respectively. In all three cities, European ancestors were mainly Iberian.

It was estimated that around 5 million Brazilians (2.5% of the population) can acquire Portuguese citizenship, due to the last Portuguese nationality law that grants citizenship to grandchildren of Portuguese nationals.

See also

 Ethnic groups in Europe
 Galicians
 Eurasians in Singapore
 Portuguese Indonesian
 Portuguese American
 Portuguese Canadians
 List of Portuguese people
 Portuguese cuisine
 Portuguese culture
 Lusitanics

References

External links

 Ethnographic Map of Pre-Roman Iberia (circa 200 BC)
 
 Portugal (Emigration) from CIA Country Studies Series

 
 
 
Romance peoples
Demographics of Portugal